The oikistes, often anglicized as oekist or oecist, was the individual chosen by an ancient Greek polis as the leader of any new colonization effort. He was invested with the power of selecting a settling place, directing the initial labors of the colonists and guiding the fledgling colony through its hard early years. The oracle is also consulted during deliberations for choosing an oikistes. After he is appointed and directed to found a colony, he also consults the Delphic oracle. Due to his authority, the oikistes was often accorded his own cult after his death, and his name was preserved even when all other details of the founding of a colony were forgotten.

References

Society of ancient Greece
Greek colonization
City founders
Greek hero cult